The Embassy of the United Kingdom in Vilnius is the chief diplomatic mission of the United Kingdom in Lithuania. The Embassy is located on Antakalnio Street, opposite the St Peter and St Paul Church. The current British Ambassador to Lithuania is Brian Olley. The Embassy also represents the British Overseas Territories in Lithuania.

The building is listed on the Lithuanian Register of Cultural Property.

History
Between the First and Second World Wars Lithuania's capital was in the city of Kaunas and the United Kingdom maintained a diplomatic representation there. The UK never recognised de jure the Soviet annexation of Lithuania in 1940.

The UK recognised Lithuania's restored independence on 27 August 1991. The British Embassy opened in Vilnius in October 1991 and moved to its current location on Antakalnio Street in April 1994. As well as the embassy in Vilnius, the UK also has and an honorary consulate in Klaipėda.

See also
 Lithuania–United Kingdom relations
 List of diplomatic missions in Lithuania
 List of Ambassadors of the United Kingdom to Lithuania

References

Vilnius
United Kingdom
Buildings and structures in Vilnius
Lithuania–United Kingdom relations
Objects listed in Lithuanian Registry of Cultural Property